The Limeliters Reunion, Vol. 2  is an album released by The Limeliters in 1976 on Brass Dolphin LP record 2202.  Recorded live on September 28, 1976 in the Seattle Opera House, the album documents one of the yearly reunion concerts given by the Limeliters in that decade.  Vol. 1 contained new material, whereas this album was a tribute to the “folk mania” of the 1960s.

Track listing 

 "Joy Across the Land" (Alex Hassilev)
 "Acres of Limelighters" (Byron Robert Walls, Raksin)
 "Funky in the Country" (Bob Gibson, Talbot)
 "Minstrel Boy" (Leon Rudd, Ben Bruce)
 "Risin' of the Moon" (Clancy Brothers)
 "Whistlin' Gypsy" (Patrick L. Maguire)
 "Gil Gary Mountain (Darlin' Sportin' Jenny)" (Gibson, Camp, Warner)
 "Meetin' Here Tonight" (Bob Gibson)
 "The Boxer" (Paul Simon, Art Garfunkel)
 "John Henry" (Glenn Yarbrough, Alex Hassilev)
 "Have Some Madera" (Michael Flander, Donald Swan)
 "Hard Travelin' / Mount Zion" (Woody Guthrie / Cal Bagby)
 "Wayfarin' Stranger" (Bob Gibson)
 "Lonesome Traveler" (Lee Hays)

Personnel
 The Limeliters (Lou Gottlieb, Alex Hassilev, Glenn Yarbrough)
 Mike Settle - acoustic guitar, vocals
 Brian Davies - acoustic guitar, electric guitar
 Gordon Currie - bass, vocals
 Jacqueline Furman - drums, percussion, vocals
 Geoffrey Pike - piano, synthesizer, vocals

References

1976 live albums
The Limeliters albums